The Universidad Autónoma de La Laguna (Autonomous University of La Laguna, commonly referred to as UAL) is a private university located in Torreón, Coahuila, Mexico. It was founded in December 1988.

The university includes four schools: the College of Administrative Sciences, the College of Sciences and Engineering, the College of Humanities, and the College of Health Sciences. UAL also operates a natural history museum and a university radio station, XHUAL-FM 98.7.

History
UAL was founded on December 4, 1988. On January 17, 1989, the university formally began academic activities. Construction on the university campus began in April 1989, with the first building opening in August 1990.

The university's history has been marked by expansion in facilities and programs. The radio station began operations in 2006.

Academics

Undergraduate (licenciatura)

College of Administrative Sciences
Business Administration
Management of Tourism Enterprises
Gastronomic Business Administration
Public Works Administration
Human Resources Management
International Trade
Public Accounting
Marketing

College of Sciences and Engineering
Architecture
Business Informatics Engineering
Engineering in Mechatronics
Automotive Systems Engineering
Computer Systems Engineering
Industrial and Systems Engineering
Graphic Design and Communication

College of Humanities
Visual Arts
Education Sciences
Communication and Journalism
Law

College of Health Sciences
Optometry
Psychology

Graduate
Specialty in Real Estate and Industrial Valuation
Master in Business Administration
Master in Human Resources Management
Master of Education
Master in Family and Couples Therapy
Doctorate in Educational Development

External links

Universities and colleges in Coahuila
1988 establishments in Mexico
Educational institutions established in 1988